Christmas is the twelfth studio album and the first Christmas album by Kenny Rogers released in 1981.

Overview
The album features several songs that were already well known at the time including "White Christmas," "When A Child is Born," "Carol of the Bells" and "My Favorite Things."  Several original Christmas songs are also included, which have also now become well-known via this album.

Christmas was also the origin of Kenny's first holiday single, "Kentucky Home Made Christmas."

The album peaked at #10 on the U.S. Country charts and #34 on the overall U.S. charts.

Track listing

Personnel 
 Kenny Rogers – lead vocals, backing vocals (3, 6), vocal arrangements 
 Gene Page – arrangements
 Barnaby Finch – acoustic piano
 Lincoln Mayorga – acoustic piano
 John Hobbs – keyboards 
 Clarence McDonald – Fender Rhodes
 Kin Vassy – acoustic guitar, backing vocals 
 Paul Jackson Jr. – guitar
 Ira Newborn – guitar
 David T. Walker – guitar
 Nathan East – bass guitar
 David Hungate – bass guitar
 Jerry Scheff – bass guitar
 Leon "Ndugu" Chancler – drums
 Gary Coleman – percussion
 Paulinho Da Costa – percussion
 Cindy Fee – backing vocals 
 Terry Williams – backing vocals 
 Jon Joyce – backing vocals (3, 6)
 Maxi Anderson – backing vocals (5)
 Marlena Jeter – backing vocals (5)
 Gwenchie Machu – backing vocals (5)
 Juance Charmaine O’Neal – backing vocals (6)

Production 
 Producer – Kenny Rogers
 Assistant Producer – Brenda Harvey-Richie
 Engineers – Reginald Dozier (Tracks 1, 3–6, 8 & 9); Al Schmitt (Tracks 2 & 7); John Arrias (Track 10).
 Second Engineer (Track 10) – Stephen Schmitt
 Mixed by Reggie Dozier 
 Art Direction and Design – Bill Burks
 Photography – Tom Gibson and Reid Miles

Re-releases

Christmas Wishes 

In some quarters (including the UK and United States) the title has changed to "Christmas Wishes" and the album reissued in 1985 with an alternate track list.  In other countries though, "Christmas" is still the title.

Alternate track list
 "White Christmas" [2:47]
 "Carol of the Bells" [2:43]
 "O Holy Night" [4:38]
 "Christmas Everyday" [3:42]
 "Kids" (CD Only) [2:42]
 "Kentucky Homemade Christmas" [4:14]
 "Christmas Is My Favorite Time of Year" [2:43]
 "Sweet Little Jesus Boy" [3:03]
 "When a Child Is Born" [3:49]
 "My Favorite Things" (CD Only) [2:59]

Chart performance

References

[ Allmusic]

1981 Christmas albums
Christmas albums by American artists
Kenny Rogers albums
albums arranged by Gene Page
Liberty Records albums
Country Christmas albums